Trygve Bendiksby (1907–1992) was a Norwegian judge.

He was born in Modum of farmer roots. He finished his secondary education in 1925, and graduated with the cand.jur. degree in 1930. From 1933 he worked as a deputy judge in Nordmøre, and from 1936 to 1940 he was a secretary in the Norwegian Ministry of Justice and the Police.

In 1946 he was an acting judge in Oslo District Court for a few months, before being appointed district stipendiary magistrate on the Senja District Court in September. In 1952 he was named as a Supreme Court Justice, and he stood in this position until his retirement in 1977. He died in 1992.

References

1907 births
1992 deaths
People from Modum
Norwegian civil servants
Supreme Court of Norway justices